Hanna Margareta Dorsin, (born 7 March 1973) is a Swedish actress and comedian. Dorsin studied acting as Teaterhögskolan in Stockholm between 1999 and 2003. Since 2014, she is part of the comedy group Grotesco.

She is married to comedian Henrik Dorsin.

Filmography
2001 – En sång för Martin 
2007–2017 – Grotesco (TV-series)
2009 – Behandlingen
2011 – Åsa-Nisse – wälkom to Knohult
2011 – Gustafsson 3 tr (TV-series)
2017 – Grotescos sju mästerverk (TV-series)
2018 – Helt perfekt (TV-series)
2018–2020 – På spåret (TV-series)
2019 – Förfärliga snömannen 
2019 – She-Ra och prinsessrebellerna (TV-series) 
2019 – Ture Sventon och Bermudatriangelns hemlighet (TV-series)
2020 – Morden i Sandhamn (TV-series)

References

External links

1973 births
Swedish television actresses
Living people
21st-century Swedish actresses
21st-century Swedish comedians
Swedish women comedians